Íñigo Manuel Velez Ladrón de Guevara y Tassis, (1642 – 5 November 1699) was a Spanish nobleman, 10th count of Oñate, 4th count of Villamediana,  a Grandee of Spain, (title bestowed to his family in 1640 by King Philip IV of Spain in 1640), and many other lesser or more recent titles, was a  Head of the Imperial Spain Couriers and Post Offices, and a Knight of the Order of the Golden Fleece in 1687.

After 1666, he married the childless, wealthy and influential Flemish widow, Louise Marie de Ligne, daughter of Claude Lamoral, Prince of Ligne, Prince of the Holy Roman Empire.

1640s births
1699 deaths
Grandees of Spain
Knights of the Golden Fleece
Counts of Villamediana
Inigo 10
Inigo 10
Spanish diplomats
1642 births